Sir William Henry Neville Goschen, 1st Baronet,  (30 October 1865 – 7 July 1945), known as Harry Goschen, was a British businessman and banker from the prominent Goschen family.

Family and early life
Harry was born at 7 Chapel Street, Grosvenor Square, London, the son of Henry Goschen (1837–1932) and Augusta Eleanor Shakerley, niece of Sir Charles Shakerley, 1st Baronet. Henry Goschen was the younger brother of George Goschen, 1st Viscount Goschen. 

Their grandfather was prominent publisher and printer Georg Joachim Göschen of Leipzig, Kingdom of Saxony. His third son Wilhelm Heinrich (William Henry) Göschen (1793–1866) came to England in 1814 and founded together with the German merchant Heinrich Frühling (1790–1841) the merchant bank Frühling & Göschen, of Leipzig and London. He married an English woman and had several children, including George, Henry and Edward. 

His younger brother was Major General Arthur Goschen. Harry was educated at Eton College from 1879 to 1884. In 1886, he was gazetted as a lieutenant in the 24th Middlesex Volunteer Rifles, the London Regiment.

Career
Goschen joined the family merchant banking firm Frühling & Göschen, and became involved in insurance. He was director of the Ocean Marine Insurance Co., Sun Insurance Office and Sun Life Assurance Society. His personality and role during the First World War were later recalled in The Times:

In 1920, he merged his families bank Frühling & Göschen with Cunliffe Brothers, owned by Lord Cunliffe, to form Goschens & Cunliffe. During his career, he served as chairman of the London Clearing banks, the National Provincial Bank and the Accepting Houses Committee, and as a director of the Chartered Bank of India, Australia, and China. Goschen also sat on various other boards and charities, including commissioner of the Public Works Loan Board, Warden of the Royal Chapel of the Savoy, Member House Committee of the London Hospital and served as Prime Warden of the Worshipful Company of Goldsmiths.

Goschen was appointed a deputy lieutenant for Essex in 1920. He retired from business in 1936.

Honours

Goschen was appointed an Officer of the Order of the British Empire (OBE) in the 1918 Birthday Honours for his services during the First World War. He was knighted in the same order (KBE) in April 1920, for "valuable services on many Government Committees" during the war.

In the 1927 Birthday Honours, Goschen was created a Baronet, of Durrington House in the Parish of Sheering and County of Essex, in the Baronetage of the United Kingdom, for public services.

He was also a Knight of Grace of the Order of St. John of Jerusalem.

Personal life
On 23 November 1893, Goschen married Christian (1871–1951), daughter of Lt.-Col. James Augustus Grant. They had one daughter, Christian Eleanor Margaret, in 1895. She married Claud Douglas-Pennant, grandson of Edward Douglas-Pennant, 1st Baron Penrhyn, and younger brother of the fifth Baron Penrhyn.

He died at Durrington House, his Essex estate, in 1945. The baronetcy became extinct upon his death.

References 

1847 births
1924 deaths
Military personnel from London
Harry Goschen
British bankers
Knights Commander of the Order of the British Empire
Baronets in the Baronetage of the United Kingdom
British people of German descent
People educated at Eton College
Deputy Lieutenants of Essex
Volunteer Force officers
London Regiment officers